The flag of Khabarovsk Krai, in the Russian Federation, is a horizontal white and light blue bicolour charged with a green triangle at the hoist side in a similar fashion to the flag of the Czech Republic, albeit with different colors. It was adopted on 14 July 1994. The proportions are 2:3.

References

Flag
Flags of the federal subjects of Russia
Flags introduced in 1994